The 2016 CS Tallinn Trophy was a senior international figure skating competition, held in November 2016 at the Tondiraba Ice Hall in Tallinn, Estonia. Its senior categories were part of the 2016–17 ISU Challenger Series. Medals were awarded in the disciplines of men's singles, ladies' singles, pair skating, and ice dancing.

Entries 

Withdrew before starting orders drawn
 Men: Jiří Bělohradský (CZE), Glebs Basins (LAT)
 Ladies: Diana Reinsalu (EST), Fruzsina Medgyesi (HUN), Byun Ji-hyun (KOR), Fleur Maxwell (LUX), Isabelle Olsson (SWE)
 Pairs: Çağla Demirsal / Berk Akalın (TUR), Marissa Castelli / Mervin Tran (USA)
 Ice dance: Varvara Ogloblina / Mikhail Zhirnov (AZE), Mina Zdravkova / Christopher M. Davis (BUL), Kristsina Kaunatskaia / Yuri Hulitski (BLR), Ekaterina Fedyushchenko / Lucas Kitteridge (GBR)

 Added
 Pairs: Alina Ustimkina / Nikita Volodin (RUS)

Results: Challenger Series

Men

Ladies

Pairs

Ice dancing

Results: Junior and advanced novice

Medal summary: Junior

Medal summary: Advanced novice

References

External links
 
 2016 CS Tallinn Trophy at the International Skating Union

Tallinn Trophy
CS Tallinn Trophy
2016 in Estonian sport